Crickmer may refer to:

Crickmer, West Virginia, a community in Fayette County, West Virginia
Mount Crickmer, a mountain in the Garibaldi Ranges
Walter Crickmer, an English football club manager